Hattiesburg is a city in Mississippi. "Hattiesburg" may also refer to:

Hattiesburg metropolitan area
Hattiesburg–Laurel Regional Airport
Hattiesburg Bobby L. Chain Municipal Airport
Hattiesburg Public School District
Hattiesburg Zoo
Hattiesburg station
Hattiesburg American
Hub City Derby Dames, formerly "Hattiesburg Southern Misfits."